The 131st Infantry Division (German: 131. Infanteriedivision) was a German Army infantry division in World War II.

Operational history
The 131st Infantry Division was activated in October 1940, primarily out of other divisions - it included soldiers from the 31st and 269th Infantry Divisions, and cavalry from the 19th.

The division participated in Operation Barbarossa and fought during the entire war on the Eastern Front. In January 1945, the division was driven into the so-called Heiligenbeil Pocket, were it was destroyed in March 1945.

Order of battle
431st Infantry Regiment
432nd Infantry Regiment
434th Infantry Regiment
131st Reconnaissance Battalion
131st Tank-destroyer Battalion
131st Engineer Battalion
131st Signal Battalion
131st Divisional-Resupply Troops

Commanders
Lieutenant General Heinrich Meyer-Buerdorf (Oct 1940-Jan 1944)
Lieutenant General Friedrich Weber (Jan-Oct 1944)
Major General of Reserves Werner Schulze (Oct 1944-Jan 1945)
Colonel Nobiz (Jan-April 1945)

Sources

Military units and formations established in 1940
Military units and formations disestablished in 1945
Infantry divisions of Germany during World War II